The Bridgehampton Sports Car Races was a sports car race held at Bridgehampton Race Circuit between 1949 and 1971.

History
The first road races in Bridgehampton were held on public roads around the hamlet of Bridgehampton from 1915 until 1921.  The course ran counterclockwise on an approximately 3-mile (4.8-km) rectangle, beginning on Montauk Highway, then turning left onto Halsey Lane, left onto Pauls Lane, left onto Ocean Boulevard, and left back onto Montauk Highway. 

The races were revived in 1949, utilizing a 4-mile (6.4-km) circuit adjacent to the pre-war circuit in Bridgehampton and Sagaponack.  It ran clockwise beginning on Ocean Road, turning right onto Sagaponack Road, right onto Sagaponack Main Street, right onto Bridge Lane, and right back onto Ocean Road.  George Huntoon won the inaugural race in an Alfa Romeo 8C.  The races proved successful, and joined the SCCA National Sports Car Championship in 1952.  The road races came to an end in 1953, after a driver was killed in practice and three spectators injured during the race.  These events, combined with a spectator death in a crash at Watkins Glen in 1952, led the State of New York to ban racing on public roads.

Local racing enthusiasts formed the Bridgehampton Road Races Corporation in 1953 to finance the construction of a permanent race circuit in the area. Although construction was not completed, the first races were held in 1957. Walt Hansgen, driving for Briggs Cunningham, dominated the National Championship races at Bridgehampton, winning the first 7 on the new permanent course. In 1965, the race switched to the SCCA's professional United States Road Racing Championship. The switch also brought the Vanderbilt Cup trophy to the race, resurrecting the race that had run on Long Island from 1904–1910 and 1936–1937. The race did not continue when the USRRC was discontinued, but was revived as a 3-hour IMSA GT Championship race in 1971. This was the last major race held at Bridgehampton before the track's demise in 1998.

Results

Road course

 Spear was leading when the race was stopped

Bridghampton Raceway

References

See also
Bridgehampton Grand Prix

IMSA GT Championship races
Sports car races
Auto races in the United States
Motorsport competitions in New York (state)